The primary stage of socialism (sometimes referred to as the preliminary stage of socialism), introduced into official discourse by Mao Zedong as the initial stage of socialism, is a sub-theory of Chinese Marxist thought which explains why capitalist techniques are used in the Chinese economy. It maintains that China is in the first stage of building a communist society, in a stage where there is private ownership.

Origins

The concept of a primary stage of socialism was conceived before China introduced economic reforms. When discussing the necessity of commodity relations at the 1st Zhengzhou Conference held between 2 and 10 November 1958, Mao Zedongthe Chairman of the Communist Party of China's Central Committeesaid that China was in the "initial stage of socialism". Mao did not elaborate on the idea; his successors did.

Xue Muqiao's theory of the "immature socialist system"
Xue Muqiao introduced the term "underdeveloped socialism" in his book China's Socialist Economy. The book was written in the orthodox Marxist–Leninist framework enunciated by Joseph Stalin in Economic Problems of Socialism in the U.S.S.R. (1952). Xue wrote that within the socialist mode of production there were several phases and for China to reach an advanced form of socialism it had to focus on developing the productive forces. He proposed a theory in which the basic laws of economic growth were those in which "the relations of production must conform to the level of the productive forces". Similarly to Stalin, Xue considered the productive forces to be primary and that this was a fundamental universal law of economics. Unlike Stalin, Xue believed there were principles that guided the socialist transition, the key one being the principle of "from each according to his ability, to each according to his work"; this principle would guide socialist development, even when China had reached advanced socialism, and would be replaced with "from each according to his ability, to each according to his need" only when there existed general abundance. Xue based his arguments upon the economic policies pursued during the Cultural Revolution, which he believed had led to "the most severe setbacks and heaviest losses suffered by the Party, the state and the people since the founding of the People's Republic".

Xue believed the relations of production were determined by ownership in the economy. He said that since the productive forces in China were "backward", the relations of production were at a comparable level. While believing industry in China had become the "ownership of the whole people", Xue said agriculture was lagging far behind, which required ending the practice of paying wages based on collective efforts, supporting the re-introduction of individual incentives and increasing state investments in agriculture. Xue's suggestions were abandoned at the 6th Plenary Session of the 11th Central Committee held in June 1981 because they failed to solve the problems facing agriculture. From the 6th Plenary Session onwards, the CPC led by Wan Li began supporting the de-collectivization of agriculture. At the beginning, Wan chose a conservative reformist approach, stating that:
Prudence is necessary when approaching the reform of the commune institutions. We should not require each level to reform from top to bottom by prescribing a time limit for fulfilment. Until suitable new organizational forms can replace production brigades and teams, we should not recklessly change existing forms and bring about a disorderly situation.

Wan called for the dismantlement of the People's Commune system and its replacement with a household-responsibility system. He referred to the changes underway in the agricultural system as the creation of a new mode of production and called it the socialist commodity economy. Party theorist Du Runsheng supported Wan's position, saying, "a principle of Marxism is that every change in the relations of ownership is an inevitable outcome of the development of new productive forces which can no longer fit in with the old relations of ownership". He also said:
Today's household undertakings are very different in nature. Since land is owned by the public, they are restricted by the collective economy in many ways. They represent a level of management in the co-operative economy, and constitute an organic component part of the entire socialist economy... It is feared that the household contracting system will promote the conservative idea of private possession among the peasants. This fear is not without grounds. However, we must be able to see the other side of the matter, which also happens to be the prevailing aspect. Today's peasants are different from those of the past. They are now new-type labourers under the socialist co-operative system.

Su Shaozhi's theory of "undeveloped socialism"
CPC theoretician Su Shaozhi, an official from the People's Daily, began a debate in 1979 at a CPC theory conference to re-examine Mao Zedong's assertion of "class struggle as the key link" when he introduced the term "undeveloped socialism" to refer to China. Su, co-writing with Feng Langrui, published an article in Economic Research in 1979 which called into question the Chinese socialist project by using Marxist methodology. The article analyzed the basis of Chinese socialism by looking at the writings of Karl Marx. Marx drew a distinction between lower-stage communismcommonly referred to as the socialist mode of production and higher-phase communismoften referred to as communism. Su's and Feng's article created two subdivisions within the socialist mode of production; the first phase was the transition from the capitalist mode of production to the socialist mode of productionthe phase in which the proletariat seized power and set-up the dictatorship of the proletariat and in which undeveloped socialism was created. The second phase was advanced socialism; the socialism that Marx wrote about. They said China was an undeveloped socialist nation because:

The characteristics of undeveloped socialism are the two forms of public ownership, commodity production and commodity exchange. Capitalists have been basically eliminated as a class but there are still capitalist and bourgeois remnants, even feudal remnants. There also exist quite a few small producers, class differences among workers and peasants … and the force of habit of small-scale producers. The production forces are still not highly developed. And there is not an abundance of products … Therefore, the transition toward socialism has not yet been completed.

Sun and Feng opposed the party line that the main contradiction in Chinese society was between the "advanced social system" and the "backward production forces". This line, originally conceived of at the 8th National Congress held in 1956 but removed by Mao and re-introduced after Mao's death, was intended to emphasize the importance of improving the economy. Su found it problematic because it meant that the superstructure could be more advanced than the level of the productive forcesa statement that was not in line with classical Marxism. Su countered, saying that China did not have a material base for a full transition to socialism. He said:
The socialist system consists mainly of production relations. Whether a production relation is advanced or not is determined by just one criterion, namely, whether or not it can meet the demands of production forces and facilitate their development. Although some production relations, such as commune ownership, may be superior to ownership by the production team in terms of the stage of development, in rural China today, where manual labor remains predominant, only ownership by the production team, rather than by the commune, would be the type of production relations capable of measuring up to the level of production forces and facilitating their development. If ... commune ownership is adopted, it would damage the development of production forces.

The response to Su and Feng's article was mixed. Some responded positively and called for a retreat from socialist practices and a return to the policies of New Democracya period that lasted until 1956 when China had a mixed economy. More conservative elements tried to suppress it. Deng Liqun, the Deputy President of the Chinese Academy of Social Sciences (CASS), used his powers to organize a meeting which criticized Su, who had become a member of the CASS Institute of Marxism–Leninism after writing the article. While Su garnered some support from high-standing officials, such as General Ye Jianying, the concept was the target of several crackdowns; the first occurred in 1981 during a crackdown on socialists supporting liberal democracy. A later crackdown was orchestrated by longstanding party theoretician Hu Qiamou and thirdly during the Anti-Spiritual Pollution Campaign in 1983. The reasoning was that the idea lent weight for forces opposed to socialism in China and was therefore dangerous. Despite this, the 6th Plenary Session of the 11th Central Committee sanctioned the idea that China was in the "primary stage of socialism", even if key theoreticians such as Wang Xiaoqiang dismissed Chinese socialism as "agrarian socialism", believing that socialism had been constructed on a feudal base.

Formulating the theory of a primary stage of socialism
Su's theory of undeveloped socialism led to the formulation of the primary stage of socialism theory under CPC General Secretary Zhao Ziyang's stewardship. The term had been used by the CPC during the Anti-Spiritual Pollution Campaign of 1983 but had never been explained. After consulting with Deng Xiaoping, the theory of a primary stage of socialism was used as the theoretical basis of the Political Report to the 13th National Congress held in 1987. The theory focused mainly on developing the productive forces and took a highly economic deterministic view on developing socialism. Despite certain pitfalls, the theory is still used to explain the use of capitalist techniques in China. The main aim of the theory was to reconceptualize socialism to make Marxism fit for contemporary use. Su and Zhang Xiangyang said the primary stage of socialism in China began in the 1950s when the CPC put an end to the policies of New Democracy and would last an estimated 100 years. The previous emphasis on economic equality in favour of economic growth was abandoned. Deng stated:

Of the many lessons we have to sum up, a very important one is this: we should make clear what is socialism and how to build socialism ... The primary task of socialism is to develop production forces and to elevate the standard of the material and cultural life of the people. Our twenty years of experience from 1958 to 1976 have told us: poverty is not socialism, socialism is to eliminate poverty. It is not socialism to not develop production forces and raise the people's living standards.

By this point, Deng had equated upholding socialism with developing the level of the productive forces; the ideal of common equality was postponed until an unspecified time. Su and Zhang reached similar conclusions, saying that Marx had two goals when he wrote about the socialist future: a social system in which the productive forces developed and the individual would be granted a great chance of self-development. However, developing the productive forces became the precondition for the greater self-learning of the individual through common equality; Su and Zhang said that the former would lead to the latter. The left were generally pleased with the theory, which was based upon orthodox Marxist premises. However, some people on the right considered the theory was proof that China needed to reintroduce capitalism to build socialism. Marx had written that socialism developed from capitalism, but China had skipped the capitalist mode of production and went from feudalism to socialism.

Zhao's adviser Bao Tong's article "The Young Horse of Socialism, the Old Horse of Capitalism, and Other Related Matters published in the People's Daily, became the first theoretical work which tried to explain the concept. Bao said because the economic foundation of socialism in China was weak and contained elements of feudalism, and that acknowledging China's position as being in the primary stage of socialism would answer "many ideological questions can be readily solved". Chen Junsheng, the Secretary General of the State Council, wrote a similar article that stressed the need to uphold the Four Cardinal Principles and reform during the primary stage of socialism.

Effect on party ideology

Changing views on capitalism

The reconception of socialism led directly to the reconception of capitalism because of their diametric opposition to each other. Previously, the CPC had said supporting capitalism meant supporting a historical retreat and capitalism was considered the diametric opposite of socialism and their relations were considered hostile and incompatible. The official reconception of the two terms was sanctioned in the Political Report to the 13th National Congress. Before the reform efforts, capitalism and socialism were believed to be part of a sequential relationship, the latter developing from the former. A less traditional view was that capitalism had proven it had a "greater capacity for creating human civilization" than Marx expected, which indirectly meant that socialism could learn from capitalism. Another mark of continuity was that the two systems existed alongside each other.

The first change in official discourse was to rebuke Vladimir Lenin's theory of imperialism. Lenin had reached the conclusion that capitalism had reached the stage of imperialism, a stage in which capitalism would undergo a protracted crisis that would lead to war, the inevitable socialist revolutions and the end of war by the newly established socialist states. This theory had formed the basis of Chinese foreign policy well into the 1970s, but was not officially rebuked until Zhao's report to the 13th National Congress. At the congress, Zhao re-used a 1985 statement by Deng Xiaoping, in which he said, "[t]he major themes of the contemporary world are peace and development". By saying that the task of socialist countries was maintaining "peace and development" rather than "war and revolution", Deng was upbraiding Lenin's theory. According to Su and Zhang, the rationale for the change was that:
 the decline in ideological conflict in tandem with the creation of nuclear weapons had radically changed East–West relations and the end of colonialism had altered the basis of North–South relations;
 technical and scientific progress haddespite Marx' forecaststrengthened capitalism and changed the international arena since Lenin's death;
 the increased economic interdependence brought by economic globalization had reduced the risks of war;
 the reforms within socialist states had brought socialist economies closer to the world market and the capitalist economies.

Xu Jiatun, a Party theoretician, said capitalism had changed from the days of Marx; proof of this was "the emergence of macroeconomic regulation, the welfare state, and the middle class that had ameliorated socioeconomic structures and class relations under capitalism. Xu concluded that capitalism had proved a more successful system than Chinese socialism, which was based on feudal ideology and institutions. Yu Guangyuan said Marx was wrong and that the changes within capitalism had allowed for a much greater development of the productive forces than Marx could ever think possible. However, the most common view was the convergence theory, whose adherents' views were published in leading media outlets throughout the country. The convergence theory said socialism and capitalism were becoming increasingly similar, since capitalist and socialist countries were becoming increasingly similar in economic terms; planning was taking place in capitalism, market economics was occurring in socialism, ownership and management were separated under both systems, and both had undergone similar patterns of modernization. On this basis, the proponents of convergence theory called on people to stop asking whether a certain technique was capitalist or socialist because it did not matter anymore. The end result of the convergence theory was to de-ideologize the meaning of the two terms.

Historical materialism: universal law or methodology

At the 13th National Congress, Zhao concluded that the common rightist error when analyzing Chinese development was to question the legitimacy of the revolution and socialist superstructural elements established in its aftermath and that the common leftist error was to believe that you could skip over the primary stage of socialism directly to advanced socialism, a view that Zhao designated as utopian. However, there was a problem; according to official statements, China had an advanced superstructure and a backward productive forces; this went against classical Marxism, which said the superstructure was "solely determined by economic factors"in China the mode of production was determined by the superstructure. All this went against the general notion of Marx' theory of historical materialism, which states that a mode of production is solely grounded on the material base. However, Su and Zhang did not believe these discrepancies had proven the theory wrong; they concluded that historical materialism should be considered "a scientific methodology for the analysis of the general trend", not a universal law that explained former and future historical processes. According to Su and Zhang, instead of viewing one factor—economy—as dominant, as was previously done, one should analyze how all factors interact with each other, especially the effects of the superstructure on the rest of society. In their view, superstructural elements "played an obvious role in China's 'leap' from semifeudalism to socialism". Socialism in China was safeguarded by the CPC and its commitment to Marxist ideology.

The problem with historical materialism as law-binding was, according to the rightists, what role humans played in historical development and the possibility of the existence of modes of production other than those outlined by Marx. According to Hong Yingsan, the notion of a primary stage of socialism was difficult because it entailed that China was simultaneously pre-capitalist and post-capitalist. This went against the basic notion in historical materialism that history was unilinear rather than multilinear, and proved that other factors than the productive forces in society "could determine the mode of production in a given society". The problem facing the CPC was that unilinear view of history meant that China could not adopt socialism because it had skipped the capitalist mode of production, but a multilinear view meant that China did not need to adopt socialism because it was not a specific "stage in human evolution". Su and Zhang said the most pressing problem for CPC theorists to answer was, "do people have freedom to choose a particular set of production relations?". They pointed to Marx's theory of an Asiatic mode of production. Some rightists argued against the mode of productions envisioned by Marx, stating that all changes in human history were subjective and were not guided by universal laws.

The role of Marxism
While the CPC pursued non-orthodox economic policies, it believed the party would be able to safeguard China's goal of socialist development by transforming Marxism into a dominant value system. This was reflected by the introduction of the term "socialist spiritual civilization", a concept introduced in 1981 and mentioned in the Political Report to the 13th National Congress. The main function of socialist spiritual civilization was to check against the dangers of ideological retreat in the party's effort to progress toward socialism. A CPC resolution in 1986 said, "we will be not able to guarantee the socialist direction of our modernization course, and our socialist society will lose its goals and ideals" if the party stopped upholding Marxist doctrine. However, because the material base, officially referred to as material civilization, created by the economic reforms did not conform with Marxist analysis of socialism, the CPC concluded that in the new era Marxism would be given the role as the dominant value system, which entailed that other value systems could be accepted but these systems could not negate Marxism.

See also 

 China model
 State capitalism

References

Citations

Sources 
 Books cited

 
 
 
 

Economic history of the People's Republic of China
Ideology of the Chinese Communist Party